The Ducal Castle of Carpineto Sinello (Italian: Castello ducale di Carpineto Sinello)  is a  Renaissance castle in Carpineto Sinello, province of Chieti, Abruzzo, southern Italy.

References

External links

ducale di Carpineto Sinello
Carpineto Sinello